Set Me Free is a 2014 album by Jennifer Knapp, released on Righteous Babe Records. The folk rock album is the second full length released by Knapp after a public declaration that she is a lesbian and choosing to market her music outside of the Christian music industry. The album has received positive reviews.

Production
She initially came out in 2010 and released Letting Go. The album was created at the same time as Knapp's memoir Facing the Music and the creation of the non-profit Inside Out Faith, which seeks to bridge the gap between sexual minorities and religious communities. The album includes semi-autobiographical material about Knapp's coming out as well as her life growing up in Kansas and some of the material written on the record dates back to 2007.

Reception
The editorial staff of AllMusic gave the album a 3.5 out of five stars, with reviewer Timothy Monger calling the album "rustic [and] introspective", praising the diversity of the songwriting as "a mix of dark, introspective ballads awash with country and blues tones as well a couple of flat-out barnburners". Metro Weekly writer Chris Gerard compares the music favorably to Emmylou Harris, Sarah McLachlan, and Lucinda Williams, characterizing it as "an engaging collection of melodic folk-rock".

Track listing
All songs written by Jennifer Knapp, except where noted
"Remedy" – 3:35
"Set Me Free" – 3:04
"Why Wait" – 3:13
"Neosho" – 3:37
"What Might Have Been" – 4:50
"Mercy's Tree" – 2:57
"The Tale" – 5:30
"So Happy" – 3:38
"The End" (Amy Courts and Knapp) – 2:44
"Sweet Love" (Anita Baker, Gary Anthony Bias, and Louis A. Johnson) – 3:11
"Come Back" – 4:20

Personnel
Jennifer Knapp – vocals, guitar

Additional musicians
Justin Cary – upright bass
Amy Courts – backing vocals
Thad DeBrock – guitar
Jen Gunderman – organ, piano
Robbie Hecht – backing vocals
Micah Hulscher – Fender Rhodes, piano
Lindsay Jamieson – drums, percussion
Will Kimborough – guitar
Shannon LaBrie – backing vocals
Doug Lancio – guitar
Jacob Lawson – production, string arrangements, violin
Joe Pisapia – pedal steel guitar
Lij Shaw – engineering

Technical personnel
Amy Brown – mastering assistant
Joe Costa – mixing
Yvonne Costa – executive production
Jim DeMain – mastering
Betsy Frazer – design
Fairlight Hubbard – photography
Michelle Maloof – executive production
Kara Wettersten – executive production

References

External links
Press release from Knapp's site announcing the album

2014 albums
Jennifer Knapp albums
Righteous Babe Records albums